Admiral Sir Harold Richard George Kinahan KBE, CB (4 June 189322 March 1980) was a Royal Navy officer who became President of the Royal Naval College, Greenwich.

Naval career
Kinahan joined the Royal Navy as a cadet at the Royal Naval College, Osborne, in 1906. He served in World War I seeing action during the Gallipoli Campaign and later specialising in gunnery. He became Assistant and later deputy director of Navigation and Direction at the Admiralty in 1934 and then Commanding Officer of the cruiser HMS Orion in 1937. He served in World War II on the staff of the Commander-in-Chief Home Fleet from 1940, commanded the battleship HMS Anson from 1942 and then became Director of Personal Services at the Admiralty from 1943. He went on to be Flag Officer commanding the 1st Cruiser Squadron of the Mediterranean Fleet in 1946, Vice President and Senior Naval Member on the Ordnance Board in 1947 and President of the Ordnance Board in 1949. His last appointment was as President of the Royal Naval College, Greenwich in 1950 before retiring in 1952.

References

1893 births
1980 deaths
Royal Navy admirals
Royal Navy admirals of World War II
Knights Commander of the Order of the British Empire
Companions of the Order of the Bath
Admiral presidents of the Royal Naval College, Greenwich
People educated at the Royal Naval College, Osborne